The 2021–22 Arkansas Razorbacks men's basketball team represented the University of Arkansas during the 2021–22 NCAA Division I men's basketball season. The team was led by third-year head coach Eric Musselman, and played its home games at Bud Walton Arena in Fayetteville, Arkansas as a member of the Southeastern Conference.

Previous season

The Razorbacks finished second in the SEC standings and earned a 3 seed in the NCAA Tournament's South Regional. Arkansas advanced to the Sweet Sixteen of the NCAA Tournament for the first time since the 1995–96 season, and then to the Elite Eight for the first time since the 1994–95 season. Freshman guard Moses Moody was named the SEC Freshman of the Year, 1st Team All-SEC, a freshman All-American, and AP Honorable Mention All-American. Moody was a lottery pick, drafted by the Golden State Warriors with the 14th pick in the 2021 NBA draft. He was the first "one-and-done" player in school history. 

The Razorbacks finished the season with an overall record of 25–7, 13–4 in SEC play, and finished ranked No. 6 in the Coaches Poll and No. 10 in the AP Poll.

Offseason

Departures

Incoming transfers

2021 recruiting class

2022 Recruiting class

Roster

Schedule and results
Arkansas played in the Hall of Fame Classic in Kansas City in November; they were scheduled to play against Kansas State and either Illinois or Cincinnati. The Razorbacks defeated Kansas State before beating Cincinnati in the Hall of Fame Classic championship game. On February 8, the Razorbacks set a new attendance record of 20,361 against top-ranked Auburn.

|-
!colspan=12 style=| Exhibition

|-
!colspan=12 style=| Regular season

|-
!colspan=12 style=|  SEC Tournament

|-
!colspan=12 style=|  NCAA Tournament

Post-Season
Senior guard JD Notae was named to the AP and the Sporting News All-American teams as a third-team selection. Notae and sophomore forward Jaylin Williams were both named 1st Team All-SEC, and Williams was also placed on the SEC All-Defensive Team.

Notae and Williams were named to the NCAA Tournament West Regional Team.

Arkansas was the only SEC team to make it beyond the 2nd Round of the NCAA Tournament, earning a second consecutive Elite Eight appearance. Arkansas finished ranked in the final Coaches Poll at #8, marking the second year in a row they finished in the Top 10. 

Notae and senior guard Au'Diese Toney declared for the NBA draft, while sophomore guard Khalen Robinson, freshman guard Chance Moore, and junior forward Connor Vanover elected to transfer.

See also
2021–22 Arkansas Razorbacks women's basketball team

References 

Arkansas Razorbacks men's basketball seasons
Arkansas
Arkansas Razorbacks men's basketball team
Arkansas Razorbacks men's basketball team
Arkansas